Mahmood Munim (born 1941) is a former Iraqi cyclist. He competed in the individual road race at the 1960 Summer Olympics.

References

External links
 

1941 births
Living people
Iraqi male cyclists
Olympic cyclists of Iraq
Cyclists at the 1960 Summer Olympics
Sportspeople from Baghdad